Iolanda Lima Fleming (born 20 June 1936, Manoel Urbano) is a Brazilian professor and politician. She is noted as the first woman to become a state governor in Brazil. She served as the Governor of Acre from  1986 to 1987.

Fleming is the daughter of Horacio Lima, a rubber tapper and native of Ceará; and Nazira Anute Lima, a Brazilian of Lebanese descent. She was married to Geraldo Fleming (1929-1991), a politician and military officer from Minas Gerais.

Fleming was originally a member of the Brazilian Democratic Movement (MDB) and served on the city council of Rio Branco, the capital of Acre, and as a deputy to the state legislature. She served as Vice Governor of Acre under Nabor Teles da Rocha Júnior as part of the Brazilian Democratic Movement (MDB). She finally served as Vice Mayor of Rio Branco, the capital of Acre, from 1989 to 1993 as part of the Brazilian Labour Party (PTB).

References 

1936 births
Living people
People from Manoel Urbano
Brazilian people of Lebanese descent
Federal University of Acre alumni
Governors of Acre (state)
Vice Governors of Acre (state)
Women state governors of Brazil

Brazilian Democratic Movement politicians
Brazilian Labour Party (current) politicians
Brazilian Labour Party (historical) politicians